Eimear Quinn represented Ireland in the 1996 Eurovision Song Contest with the song "The Voice".

Before Eurovision

National final 
The final took place on 3 March 1996 at the Point Theatre in Dublin, hosted by Pat Kenny. Eight entries competed in the final and the winner, "The Voice" performed by Eimear Quinn, was determined by the votes of ten regional juries.

At Eurovision
As part of the EBU's scheme to limit the growing number of countries wishing to participate, audio recordings of the entries were sent to juries in each participating country some weeks before the contest. The juries listened to the songs, and awarded points to their ten favorites. Of the 29 countries wishing to participate (host country Norway was exempt from the process), only the 22 highest-scorers were allowed to perform in the contest. In this qualifying round, "The Voice" came in 2nd place with 187 points, and confirmed an Irish presence in Oslo that year.

Quinn performed 17th in the running order on the night of the contest. "The Voice" went on to win with 162 points, giving Ireland its seventh overall victory, and its fourth in five years.

Voting

Qualifying round

Final

References

1996
Countries in the Eurovision Song Contest 1996
Eurovision
Eurovision